Mark Nicholas Ourada (born April 28, 1956) is an American politician in the state of Minnesota. He served in the Minnesota State Senate.

References

1956 births
Living people
People from Buffalo, Minnesota
People from Olmsted County, Minnesota
College of Saint Benedict and Saint John's University
Republican Party Minnesota state senators